St. Leon is an unincorporated community recognized as a local urban district in Manitoba, Canada. It is located in the Municipality of Lorne to the southwest of Winnipeg, near the United States border. The community is best known as the site of the St. Leon Wind Farm project.

See also 
List of regions of Manitoba
List of rural municipalities in Manitoba

References 

Saint Leon
Manitoba communities with majority francophone populations